Forum Mall also known as Forum Courtyard is a shopping mall located in Bhowanipore, South Kolkata, India. It was initially conceived as an office tower. 80% of the foundation was complete before it was converted into a mall.  Currently it has a built-up area of  200,000 square feet, of which 125,000 square feet is the gross leasable (retail) area. It was opened to the public with the sole intention of launching Shoppers' Stop in Kolkata for the first time, in 2003. Its opening was credited with turning its neighbourhood from a quiet residential area into an upmarket shopping destination. It has been noted for its excellent layout and signage. The mall is constructed and owned by Rahul Saraf, Chairman of SAPL. The Mall also has a branch in Bhubaneswar named Forum Mart and has a new addition in Belur area of Howrah as Forum Rangoli Mall.

The tenants are diverse ranging from retail outlets to entertainment multiplex theatres to dining. The mall offers paging services and a dedicated telephone exchange. As of July 2003, the mall had parking space for 175 cars and planned to increase it to 700 cars in 18 months.

Amenities
It has six floors, four of which are dedicated to shopping, with many brands having outlets here, some of which are: Shoppers Stop, The Label Life, Adidas, Hush Puppies, Crocs,  Metro, Reebok, Crocs, Speedo, The Body Shop, Colour Bar, Forest Essentials, MAC, Vero Moda, Global Desi, Kazo.
The 5th floor is a dedicated Food Court, offering fine dining outlets to traditional Bengali cuisines like Oh! Calcutta, Cafe Mezzuna, Spaghetti Kitchen and TGIF.
The sixth floor is a 4-hall movie complex operated by INOX. It has a small outlet of Wow! Momo.

Gallery

References

 Shopping malls in Kolkata
 Shopping malls established in 2003
2003 establishments in West Bengal